William Woodruff Dancy (born November 10, 1951 at Saint Augustine, Florida) is an American baseball manager and coach. He was third base coach for the Philadelphia Phillies during the 2005 and 2006 seasons.  Currently, Dancy is the Minor League Field Coordinator for the Detroit Tigers.

Baseball career
Bill Dancy played for six years in the Phillies minor league system. His achievements include: hitting a home run batting both left-handed and right-handed in a game, batting .311 in one season for a Triple A baseball team, and hitting eight straight pinch hits (occurred during his fifth year).

References

 
 
 https://news.google.com/newspapers?id=zVIiAAAAIBAJ&sjid=2qYFAAAAIBAJ&pg=6102,3477690&dq=baseball+bill-dancy&hl=en

Living people
Philadelphia Phillies coaches
Portland Beavers managers
1951 births
Baseball players from Florida
Reading Phillies managers
Reading Phillies players
Spartanburg Phillies players
Tidewater Tides players
Oklahoma City 89ers players
Toledo Mud Hens players